Babatngon (IPA: [bɐbɐt'ŋon]), officially the Municipality of Babatngon, is a 4th class municipality in the province of Leyte, Philippines. According to the 2020 census, it has a population of 28,823 people.

Babatngon is located in the northern part of the island of Leyte, along the shore of Carigara Bay. It is situated on a small plain set in a semicircle of mountain ranges and nestles in the northern mouth of the San Juanico Strait, which separates Samar from Leyte. Boats coming in or going out of Tacloban City have to pass by it through the pilot station of Canaway, one of the islets along the strait. Small coconut covered islets fringe its coast along San Juanico Strait, the most important of which are Rizal, Magsaigad, Tabigue, almost all of which extend from east to west.

History

Historical Location
There are divergent versions as to the first municipal site of Babatngon. Some say that the first settlement was called San Juanico in Bacod Island from which the name San Juanico strait was derived. Another version says that the first settlement was San Vicente, which was part of Bacod Island, while still others say that the first municipal site was in the present barangay of Malibago. The most favored version, however, is that Babatngon and Malibago existed as separate settlements along the San Juanico strait during the 17th century and then in the process of growth, Babatngon became a municipality earlier than the other settlements.

Another version claims that Babatngon was founded as an outpost. This version may be proven by the presence of two "baluartes" or watchtowers at Bijuco and Magsaigad.

Settlement
Babatngon was first settled in 1540 by natives of Carigara, Catbalogan (Samar) and migrants from Bohol. The Boholanos traded mats, abacá cloths, bolos and other goods. One day, near the end of the year 1600, the Boholano traders were stranded in the present site of Babatngon because of unfavorable winds. The town at the time was covered by thick forests from the shore to the uplands with undergrowth of pandans and guava trees. Greatly in need of food, they hunted for wild animals and found wild game to be rich. Inspired by their first abundant catch, they went home and told their home folks about the rich hunting ground. Encouraged by the news and inspired by their desire to settle in fertile lands which they can call their own, many Boholanos came equipped with large traps called "batong" made of abacá fibers.

From "batong", the place was called "Babatngon" - hunting ground with the use of a net. The early Spaniards called the town "Babagnon" but the natives changed the original name into "Babatngon" for easier diction.

Colonial Period
The conquistadors' first concern was religion, thus it was Fr. Juan Quimbo who constructed the first church. At the turn of the century, the friars turned over the parish to the secular priests. Remembered for the contributions to the parish are:

Fr. Masecampo who established the first "campo santo" which has lived to the present; Fr. F. Langteco who reconstructed the church after it was destroyed by typhoons; Fr. A Colasito who constructed the belfry; Fr. F. Rostata who began the reconstruction of the church after the war; and finally, Fr. A. Alve to whom belongs the distinction of giving Babatngon Church the finishing touches. Fr. Alve was also responsible for constructing the first convent.

Today there are ten religious organizations all dedicated to St. Vincent Ferrer, Babatngon's patron saint. According to a census, out of a population of 12,000 inhabitants, only 98 are non-Catholics.

Expansion
The expansion of the town was sparked by the establishment of a British trading post - called "Almacen" in Soledad street. Soon after the trading post was organized, huge brick and adobe commercial houses were constructed across the street. The trade name of the establishment was Smith Bell.

Immigrants from Japan, Carigara, Barugo, San Miguel and from the coastal towns of Western Samar and other countries flocked to Babatngon which had grown into a commercial district.

Farming and fishing became the chief industries of the new and thriving town. Rice, corn, abacá and coconuts grew in abundance. The manufacture of wooden sandals (bakya) inevitably developed from the presence of an almost inexhaustible source of soft wood, the material from which sandals are patiently carved. The sandals have reached far and wide and have found a market even in Surigao.

Revolutionary Period
In 1901, when the uprising rocked the entire archipelago from end to end, a band of revolucionarios led by Domingo Inbrua fought openly with the guardias civiles and caused havoc in the garrisons of Carigara and Barugo. The revolucionarios, armed with bolos and other crude weapons struck fear in the hearts of their better-trained armed adversaries.

However, Babatngon had its share of misfortune. The stone buildings were ruined when the Spaniards made their last stand during the revolution within the town proper. No sooner had the people recovered from the devastation when another war razed the school building, the town hall, recreational centers and countless residential houses to the ground.

WW II and Japanese Occupation
During the Second World War, Mayor Melchor Cañete guided the townspeople through the difficulties of food shortage and unsettled times. Mayor Cañete kept the peace in Babatngon so well during the Japanese occupation that the seat of provincial government was temporarily transferred to the town. Moreover, Many evacuees found refuge in the town from the dangers of their own municipalities.

In 1944 to 1945, an attack by combined American and the Philippine Commonwealth troops took the town of Babatngon, Leyte.

Today
Banditry created a ripple of unrest in Babatngon's history for a time. Bandit lairs in Poro, Kalangawan Island, and Toyong on Kalkagan Island hid two of the fiercest leaders of organized piracy. Punitive forces under the leadership of Capitan Cecilio Serrano raided the bandits' lair and in a hand-to-hand encounter succeeded in killing the two bandits and many of their followers. The imprisonment of the bandits and the death of their leaders disorganized the others so that again, peace came to the town.

Geography

Barangays
Babatngon is politically subdivided into 25 barangays. In 1957, sitios Biasong, Lube, Ubayan, Calcagan, Cancamaoy, and Opong was constituted into barrio Biasong while sitio Nababoy was converted into barrio San Ricardo.

Climate

Demographics

Economy

Tourism
Babatngon is known for Busay Falls, a three-tiered cataract which is an attraction for picnickers who flock to Babatngon during the summer months. A massive bowl of solid, moss-covered rock catches the cool waters of the third fall.

Infrastructure
There are 11 barrios linked to the town proper with "vecinal" roads. These are provided with artesian wells. Barrio Bagahupi has been made a pilot barrio in the study of schistosomiasis as the area has been suspected of being positive for the parasite.

Although some of the buildings burned down during the war have not been reconstructed, several pre-fabricated buildings have taken care of the needs of the children.

References

External links

 [ Philippine Standard Geographic Code]
Philippine Census Information
Local Governance Performance Management System

Municipalities of Leyte (province)